The 2007–08 NCAA Division III men's ice hockey season began on October 19, 2007 and concluded on March 23 of the following year. This was the 35th season of Division III college ice hockey.

The MCHA added two teams for this season, bringing its membership above the minimum required (seven) to receive an automatic bid for the NCAA tournament. In order to receive the bid, the MCHA announced that all of its members must be Division III programs after the 2009 season. This new rule only affected Minnesota–Crookston, who would spend the next two years attempting to find a solution.

Regular season

Season tournaments

Standings

Note: Mini-game are not included in final standings

2008 NCAA Tournament

Note: * denotes overtime period(s)

See also
 2007–08 NCAA Division I men's ice hockey season

References

External links

 
NCAA